Artificial radiation belts are radiation belts that have been created by high-altitude nuclear explosions.

The table above only lists those high-altitude nuclear explosions for which a reference exists in the open (unclassified) English-language scientific literature to persistent artificial radiation belts resulting from the explosion.

The Starfish Prime radiation belt had, by far, the greatest intensity and duration of any of the artificial radiation belts.

The Starfish Prime radiation belt damaged the United Kingdom Satellite Ariel 1 and the United States satellites, Traac, Transit 4B, Injun I and Telstar I.   It also damaged the Soviet satellite Cosmos V.  All of these satellites failed completely within several months of the Starfish detonation.

Telstar I lasted the longest of the satellites damaged by the Starfish Prime radiation, with its complete failure occurring on February 21, 1963.

In Los Alamos Scientific Laboratory report LA-6405, Herman Hoerlin gave the following explanation of the history of the original Argus experiment and of how the nuclear detonations led to the development of artificial radiation belts.

In 2010, the United States Defense Threat Reduction Agency issued a report that had been written in support of the United States Commission to Assess the Threat to the United States from Electromagnetic Pulse Attack.  The report, entitled "Collateral Damage to Satellites from an EMP Attack," discusses in great detail the historical events that caused artificial radiation belts and their effects on many satellites that were then in orbit.  The same report also projects the effects of one or more present-day high-altitude nuclear explosions upon the formation of artificial radiation belts and the probable resulting  effects on satellites that are currently in orbit.

See also 
 Operation Argus
 Outer Space Treaty
 Soviet Project K nuclear tests
 Starfish Prime
 Operation Fishbowl
 Van Allen radiation belt
 Lawrence Berkeley National Laboratory
 Lists of environmental topics
 Nicholas Christofilos

References

External links 
 Wm. Robert Johnston. High-altitude nuclear explosions
 

Exoatmospheric nuclear weapons testing
Earth
Nuclear technology-related lists